The American Twenty20 Championship (often referred to as the USACA Twenty20 Championship) is an American Twenty20 cricket tournament aimed at grooming American cricket players for international events and to spread interest in American Cricket.

History

Its first season was only a 3-day affair as the tournament was played in New Jersey and was eventually won by the Atlantic Division. The tournament is supported by the United States of America Cricket Association, the national federation of cricket in the US.

After not being held in 2012 and 2013, the USACA announced that the tournament would be played in 2014.  The tournament was to take place in Indianapolis, and be broadcast online by ESPN3. However, in May 2014, the city of Indianapolis, Indiana announced that it had terminated its agreement to host the tournament which was due to be held during August in the brand new, $6 million Indianapolis World Sports Park facility.  Indianapolis Parks and Recreation director John W Williams sent a letter to USACA notifying them of the termination and a city official confirmed that the decision includes not just the 2014 championship but the entire three-year agreement which had been signed in September 2013 under former USACA chief executive Darren Beazley.  In June 2014, USA Cricket Association announced that the tournament would now be moved to Lauderhill, Florida.

Structure
The tournament is structured in a round-robin format with the first two days being a group stage with the groups divided by West and East.

On the final day the first place team from the Western Conference played the first place team from the Eastern Conference for the tournament title. Corresponding second, third and fourth place teams in each conference will also play a third place, fifth place and seventh place match.

The following divisions participated in the American Twenty20 Championship:
 Atlantic
 Central East
 Central West
 New York
 North East
 North West
 South East
 South West

Stats and Records

Winners

Individual records

References

American domestic cricket competitions
Professional cricket leagues
Professional sports leagues in the United States